All India Youth League is the youth wing of the Indian political party All India Forward Bloc. 

AIYL was founded in 1928 by Subhas Chandra Bose, as the first national youth organization. By the end of 1929 the youth movement was growing, with AIYL being set up across the country.

Ansar Harvani was the president of AIYL 1946-1952.

AIYL is a member of World Federation of Democratic Youth. It became a WFDY affiliate in 1951.

References

Youth wings of political parties in India
All India Forward Bloc